Logan House is a historic hotel located at Wilmington, New Castle County, Delaware. It was built in 1865, and is a three-story, five bay by five bay, flat roofed brick building with Italianate elements.  It has three one-story wings; one original brick wing, a wing added about 1910, and a concrete block wing added about 1960.  Also on the property is a contributing brick carriage house.  The hotel was named for American Civil War General John A. Logan.  It has been owned by the Kelly family since 1889 and has been a traditional gathering place on St. Patrick's Day. In the 1930s, the hotel closed and only a restaurant and tavern remained in operation.

It was added to the National Register of Historic Places in 1980.

References

External links
Kelly's Logan House website

Hotel buildings on the National Register of Historic Places in Delaware
Italianate architecture in Delaware
Hotel buildings completed in 1865
Houses in Wilmington, Delaware
National Register of Historic Places in Wilmington, Delaware